Gateway Distriparks Limited is an Indian logistics company based in Mumbai, India with three business verticals: Container Freight Stations (CFS), Inland Container Depots (ICD) with rail movement and Cold Chain Storage & Logistics. The company was founded in April 1994 and originally promoted by Newsprint Trading & Sales Corporation (NTSC), CWT Distribution Limited, NUR Investment and Trading Pvt. Ltd. and Intercontinental Forest Products Pte. Ltd. (IFP) as a joint venture company to conduct the business of warehousing, container freight stations and all related activities. As of November 2015, Prism International Private Limited (same group as NTSC) is the sole promoter of the company.

History

Core Business

GDL operates three core businesses: Container Freight Stations (CFS), Rail-linked Inland Container Depots (ICD) and Cold Chain Storage & Logistics.

Container Freight Stations (CFS)
GDL operates Container Freight Stations, located at major Indian ports such as Navi Mumbai, Chennai, Visakhapatanam and Kochi. The stations offer container yards, general warehousing, bonded warehousing, empty handling and RFID technologies used for container tracking. GDL also has its own dedicated fleet of over 25 rakes and 265 trailers for first and last mile connectivity.

Rail-linked Inland Container Depots (ICD)
GDL's rail operations are handled by its subsidiary, Gateway Rail Freight Limited. The ICDs are located at Garhi Harsaru (Gurgaon, Haryana), Sahnewal (Ludhiana, Punjab) and Faridabad, Haryana. In 2010, Blackstone Group had invested 300 crores in GatewayRail, and then in 2019 GDL bought back the entire shareholding from Blackstone. Company had announced the fifth rail linked container terminal of its subsidiary, Gateway Rail Freight Limited at Viramgam.

Cold Chain Logistics
The cold chain logistics of GDL is run by its subsidiary, Snowman Logistics Limited.

References

External links

Logistics companies of India
Companies based in Mumbai
Indian companies established in 1994
1994 establishments in Maharashtra
Companies listed on the National Stock Exchange of India
Companies listed on the Bombay Stock Exchange